Atunaisa Vunivalu is a Fijian rugby league footballer who represented Fiji in the 2000 World Cup.

Playing career
Vunivialu played in three matches for Fiji in the 2000 World Cup. He scored a hat-trick against Russia including a 90-metre try, then a record.

In 2008, while playing for the Mango Bay Cowboys in the Fiji National Rugby League Grand Final, Vunivialu punched referee Sale Tubuna. The match was abandoned and he was subsequently suspended for five years.

References

Living people
Fijian rugby league players
Fiji national rugby league team players
Rugby league locks
I-Taukei Fijian people
Year of birth missing (living people)